Pescetarians (also known as pescatarians) are people who adhere to a pescetarian diet that incorporates seafood as the only source of meat in an otherwise vegetarian diet. The following people are recognized as notable pescetarians, either currently or historically.

See also

List of vegans
List of vegetarians
List of fictional vegetarian characters

References

pescetarian
Semi-vegetarianism